Leslie V. Kurke (born 1959) is a Richard and Rhoda Goldman Distinguished Professor, Professor of Classics and Comparative Literature at University of California, Berkeley.

She graduated from Bryn Mawr College with a B.A. in 1981, and from Princeton University with a Ph.D. in 1988.

Awards
1999 MacArthur Fellows Program

Works
The traffic in praise: Pindar and the poetics of social economy, Cornell University Press, 1991, 
Cultural poetics in archaic Greece: cult, performance, politics, Editors Carol Dougherty, Leslie Kurke, Oxford University Press, 1998, 
Coins, bodies, games, and gold: the politics of meaning in archaic Greece, Princeton University Press, 1999, 
The cultures within ancient Greek culture: contact, conflict, collaboration, Editors Carol Dougherty, Leslie Kurke, Cambridge University Press, 2003, 
 Aesopic conversations: popular tradition, cultural dialogue, and the invention of Greek prose, Princeton University Press, 2011,

References

American classical scholars
Women classical scholars
Classical scholars of the University of California, Berkeley
Bryn Mawr College alumni
Princeton University alumni
MacArthur Fellows
Living people
1959 births